Astroloma humifusum, commonly known as the native cranberry or cranberry heath, is a small prostrate shrub or groundcover in the heath family Ericaceae. The species is endemic to south-eastern Australia.

Description
Astroloma humifusum grows as a spreading mat-like shrub up to 50 cm (20 in) high  and 0.5 to 1.5 m (20 in to 5 ft) across. Its hairy stems bear blue-green pine-like acute leaves 0.5-1.2 cm (0.2-0.5 in) long. The tubular flowers are up to 2 cm (0.8 in) long and appear from February to June, and are all red, unlike the red and green flowers of A. pinifolium. Flowers are followed by green globular berries around 0.4-0.6 cm (0.2 in) in diameter, which become reddish as they ripen.

Taxonomy
Astroloma humifusum was initially described as Ventenatia humifusa by Spanish botanist Antonio José Cavanilles in 1797, before being given its current binomial name by prolific Scottish botanist Robert Brown  in his 1810 work Prodromus Florae Novae Hollandiae.

Brown also described a second species, Astroloma denticulatum, based on plant material that he had collected at Memory Cove in South Australia. It was later treated as a subspecies of A. humifusum (A. humifusum var. denticulatum), but is currently treated as a synonym of A. humifusum.

In Western Australia, the name Astroloma humifusum has been misapplied to Astroloma prostratum.

Styphelia humifusa is a name found in literature. Some authorities regard it as a synonym for Astroloma humifusum.

Common names
Common names include cranberry heath and native cranberry, as the fruits were eaten by early settlers. An old name is juniper-leaved astroloma. A common nineteenth century name was the ground berry.

Distribution and habitat
The range is in southeastern Australia, from Newcastle in the north in eastern and central New South Wales, into Victoria, south-eastern South Australia and Tasmania. It is generally found in open woodland, both on sandstone and clay soils, as well as upland bogs. Associated plant species include Eucalyptus fibrosa, Eucalyptus sideroxylon, and Kunzea ambigua.

Ecology
The eastern bettong (Bettongia gaimardi) eats the fruit.

Uses
Requiring good drainage in the garden, Astroloma humifusum can be grown in rockeries. The juicy berries are edible, although they are mostly made up of a large seed. They can be used to make jams or preserves. The flavour of the berries has been described as "sickly sweet".

The 1889 book 'The Useful Native Plants of Australia records that "The fruits of these dwarf shrubs have a viscid sweetish pulp, with a relatively large stone. The pulp is described by some as being "apple flavoured..."

References

humifusum
Ericales of Australia
Flora of New South Wales
Flora of South Australia
Flora of Tasmania
Flora of Victoria (Australia)
Plants described in 1797